"365 Nichi Kazoku" is a single release by the Japanese boyband Kanjani8. This release marks their 18th single. The single was used as the theme song for the Tokyo Broadcast Systems drama, Umareru.

Track listing

Regular edition 
   (5:43)
 "Train in the Rain" (4:13)
  (5:11)
 "Eightpop!!!!!!!!" (4:16)
   (5:43)
 "Train in the Rain (Original Karaoke)" (4:13)

Limited edition 
   (5:43)
 "Train in the Rain" (4:13)

DVD 
  Music Clip and Making

Charts

References 

2011 singles
Kanjani Eight songs
Japanese television drama theme songs
Oricon Weekly number-one singles
Billboard Japan Hot 100 number-one singles